Lambs Knoll is a peak of South Mountain on the border of Washington County and Frederick County in the state of Maryland. The  peak is the second tallest on South Mountain in Maryland behind Quirauk Mountain.

Geography
The peak is located to the south of Fox and Turner's Gaps, and marks the beginning of geographic change in South Mountain from a solitary narrow ridge to a broad highland plateau, as it nears the convergence with Catoctin Mountain.

The Appalachian Trail passes just to the southeast of the summit but a spur trail leads from it to the crest near an old fire tower and former Federal military microwave communications facility and concrete tower, now used by the FAA.  Just south of the peak the AT passes by White Rocks which provides the best views from the mountain.   The Potomac Appalachian Trail Club maintained Bear Springs Cabin is located on the eastern slope of the mountain.

History
Lambs Knoll was referred to as Lamb's Old Field in the 19th century and is likely named for Milton and Mary Lamb who are believed to have farmed the mountains summit in the 1830s.  The old nomenclature persisted through the civil war and possibly in to the 20th century.  The first published use of the modern name came in 1934 when the Civilian Conservation Corps erected a fire tower on the summit.  The fire tower was staffed through the late 1940s and used by hikers to obtain views of the Middletown and Hagerstown valleys until it was fenced off by the state of Maryland in the 1980s.

References
 Strain, Paula. The Blue Hills of Maryland.  Potomac Appalachian Trail Club, 1993 pp. 116–119

External links
 

Mountains of Maryland
Mountains on the Appalachian Trail
South Mountain Range (Maryland−Pennsylvania)
Landforms of Washington County, Maryland
Landforms of Frederick County, Maryland
Civilian Conservation Corps in Maryland